Florian Maitre (born 3 September 1996) is a French professional racing cyclist, who currently rides for UCI ProTeam . He rode in the men's team pursuit at the 2016 UCI Track Cycling World Championships.

Major results
2014
 7th Chrono des Nations Juniors
2016
 1st  Team pursuit, UEC European Track Championships 
 9th Paris–Mantes-en-Yvelines
2017
 UEC European Track Championships
1st  Madison (with Benjamin Thomas)
1st  Team pursuit 
2018
 3rd Paris–Mantes-en-Yvelines
 10th Overall Tour du Maroc
1st  Mountains classification
2019
 10th Overall Paris–Arras Tour

References

External links
 

1996 births
Living people
French male cyclists
People from Meudon
French track cyclists
Sportspeople from Hauts-de-Seine
Cyclists from Île-de-France